Alison Rempel Brown (born ) is an American nonprofit executive. She is the president of the Science Museum of Minnesota, a role she began in May 2016. She was previously the chief of staff at the California Academy of Sciences.

References

External links
Biography page at the Science Museum of Minnesota

21st-century American businesswomen
21st-century American businesspeople
Living people
American nonprofit executives
Pomona College alumni
Pomona College trustees
1950s births